Schrassig is a town in the commune of Schuttrange, in the south-east of Luxembourg. It houses the country's biggest prison.

Schuttrange
Towns in Luxembourg